The 2013–14 Saint Joseph's Hawks  basketball team represented Saint Joseph's University during the 2013–14 NCAA Division I men's basketball season. The Hawks, led by 19th year head coach Phil Martelli, played their home games at Hagan Arena and were members of the Atlantic 10 Conference. They finished the season 24–10, 11–5 in A-10 play to finish in a tie for third place. They were champions of the A-10 tournament to earn the conferences automatic bid to the NCAA tournament where they lost in the second round to UConn.

Roster

Schedule

|-
!colspan=9 style="background:#A00000; color:#726A5F;"| Regular season

|-
!colspan=9 style="background:#A00000; color:#726A5F;"| Atlantic 10 tournament

|-
!colspan=9 style="background:#A00000; color:#726A5F;"| NCAA tournament

References

Saint Joseph's Hawks men's basketball seasons
Saint Joseph's
Saint Joseph's